Bobby Dixon or Ali Muhammed (born April 10, 1983), is an American-born naturalized Turkish professional basketball former player who played at the point guard position. He also represented the senior Turkish national basketball team, as he holds Turkish citizenship since 2015, under the name of Ali Muhammed.

College career
After graduating from Chicago's Sullivan High School, Dixon played college basketball at Troy University. In his two-year career with the Trojans, he played in 59 games, averaging 16.3 points, 4.6 rebounds, and 5.3 assists per game. He was also named to the 2005–06 All-Sun Belt Conference First Team.

Professional career
Dixon started his professional career in France with  Saint-Étienne Basket. In May 2007, he signed a contract with the French League team Gravelines until the end of the season. In the summer of 2007, he signed a contract with Polpak Świecie of the Polish Basketball League. He led the 2007–08 season Polish League in assists, averaging 5.1 per game. In the summer of 2008, he signed a contract with the Italian League team Pallacanestro Treviso. In February 2009, he moved to the France again, signed by Le Mans Sarthe Basket. In the summer of 2009, he signed a contract with the French League team ASVEL Basket. In 2010, he moved to the Italy, signed by Pallacanestro Treviso again. In the summer of 2010, he signed a contract with the Italian League team New Basket Brindisi. In the summer of 2011, he signed a contract with the French League team Dijon Basket.

Karşıyaka (2012–2015)
In July 2012, Dixon signed a contract with Karşıyaka of the Turkish League. On February 9, 2014, he was named the MVP with 19 points, 5 rebounds, and 6 assists in the Turkish Cup final game against Anadolu Efes S.K. He also helped to lead them to a Turkish President's Cup victory against Fenerbahçe in 2014. He was named to the All-EuroCup Second Team in the 2014–15 EuroCup season. On June 19, 2015, he won the Turkish League championship with Karşıyaka, after beating Anadolu Efes by a series score of 4–1 in the Turkish League Finals. Dixon was named the Turkish League Finals MVP.

Fenerbahçe (2015–2021)
On July 21, 2015, Dixon signed a two-year contract with Fenerbahçe. On 28 March 2016, he had a 23 points, 12 rebounds, and 10 assists performance against Beşiktaş, which marked his first triple double in the team. That triple double, was the third in Fenerbahce history, after Mark Dickel had a 16 points, 13 rebounds, and 11 assists performance against Galatasaray, in the 2002–03 season; and Emir Preldžić had 10 points, 15 rebounds, and 10 assists against Olin Edirne, in the 2010–11 season.

In 2017–18 EuroLeague, Fenerbahçe made it to the 2018 EuroLeague Final Four, its fourth consecutive Final Four appearance. Eventually, they lost to Real Madrid with 80–85 in the final game. Over 20 EuroLeague games, he averaged 7 points, 1.1 rebounds and 1.2 assists per game, in decreased playing time over last season.

In April 2019, he signed a new two-year contract with Fenerbahçe, staying at the club until the end of 2020–21 season. Dixon parted ways with the team on September 14, 2021.

On October 14, 2021, he has announced his retirement from professional basketball and started to work as a Youth Coach for Fenerbahçe Beko.

Turkish national team
After receiving Turkish citizenship, Dixon became a member of the senior men's Turkish national basketball team. With the Turkish national team, he played at the EuroBasket 2015, and the Manila 2016 FIBA World Olympic Qualifying Tournament.

Career statistics

EuroLeague

|-
| style="text-align:left;"| 2009–10
| style="text-align:left;"| ASVEL Basket
| 10 || 10 || 28.0 || .451 || .353 || .750 || 2.6 || 3.1 || 1.4 || .0 || 11.5 || 9.8
|-
| style="text-align:left;"| 2015–16
| style="text-align:left;" rowspan=4| Fenerbahçe
| 28 || 21 || 24.7 || .405 || .379 || .895 || 3.3 || 3.6 || 1.0 || .1 || 10.8 || 11.4
|-
| style="text-align:left;background:#AFE6BA;"| 2016–17†
| 34 || 25 || 25.3 || .414 || .388 || .906 || 2.7 || 3.1 || 1.0 || .0 || 11.4 || 10.7
|-
| style="text-align:left;"| 2017–18
| 21 || 6 || 11.3 || .468 || .462 || .750 || 1.1 || 1.2 || .3 || .0 || 7.0 || 6.2
|-
| style="text-align:left;"| 2018–19
| 34 || 22 || 17.8 || .518 || .496 || .867 || 1.7 || 2.2 || .6 || .0 || 9.3 || 8.9
|- class="sortbottom"
| align="center" colspan="2"| Career
| 127 || 84 || 21.2 || .444 || .415 || .866 || 2.3 || 2.7 || .8 || .0 || 10.3 || 9.6

Domestic leagues

Personal
In June 2015, Dixon received a Turkish passport and citizenship, which legally changed his name in Turkey to Ali Muhammed.

References

External links
 
 Bobby Dixon at eurobasket.com
 Ali Muhammed at euroleague.net
 Ali Muhammed at fibaeurope.com 
 Bobby Dixon at tblstat.net

1983 births
Living people
American emigrants to Turkey
American expatriate basketball people in France
American expatriate basketball people in Italy
American expatriate basketball people in Poland
American expatriate basketball people in Turkey
American men's basketball players
ASVEL Basket players
Basketball players from Chicago
BCM Gravelines players
Fenerbahçe men's basketball players
JDA Dijon Basket players
Junior college men's basketball players in the United States
Karşıyaka basketball players
Le Mans Sarthe Basket players
New Basket Brindisi players
Pallacanestro Treviso players
Point guards
Shooting guards
Sportspeople from Chicago
Troy Trojans men's basketball players
Turkish men's basketball players
Turkish people of African-American descent